George Pyper may refer to:
 George D. Pyper, American leader of the Church of Jesus Christ of Latter-day Saints
 George W. Pyper, American screenwriter